London–Edinburgh–London (LEL) is a randonnée bicycle event of approximately  over an out-and-back course between the capital cities of London (England) and Edinburgh (Scotland). It has been described as a contender for hardest cycling event in the United Kingdom.

The event has been held every four years since 1989, with the ninth event starting on 7 August 2022.

Description and history 
LEL is the flagship event of Audax UK. It is held every four years, two years after Paris–Brest–Paris. It is part of the brevet series and is a noncompetitive endurance bicycle event.

1989 to 2001
The first LEL was in 1989, when there were 29 starters and 26 finishers, all British. Finishers of that original event are sometimes referred to as the A68 Club. The inaugural ride did not start in London, but in Doncaster, the home town of the organiser. Riders headed first north to Edinburgh and back, then south to London and back.

2005
For the fifth edition in 2005, there were 306 starters and 246 finishers, from the UK, mainland Europe, and other countries including Japan, Russia, Australia, the USA, and Canada. Riders set out from Cheshunt, on the northern outskirts of London, or from Thorne, close to the original Doncaster start.

The 2005 route was just over 1360km long and arrived in Edinburgh via The Granites.

2009
31 nations took part in the 2009 ride, which started and ended at Cheshunt.

2013
The 2013 edition was held between 28 July and 2 August and 34 nations took part. In a departure from previous editions, the route took a loop through Scotland, and for the first time passed over the Humber Bridge.

805 riders finished the event in 2013.

2017

The 2017 edition took place between 30 July and 4 August 2017, attracting 1600 entrants from 55 nations. 810 of these finished in time. The 2017 route was 1441km long and had 11,128m of climbing. The time allowance was 117 hours 05 minutes, or 100 hours for those riders who choose it.

The ride started and ended at Davenant Foundation School in Loughton. The control points/accommodation stops were at:
Great Easton (southbound only)
St Ivo School in St Ives
Spalding Grammar School 
King Edward VI Grammar School in Louth
Pocklington School
Coxwold (optional shelter)
Thirsk School
Barnard Castle School
Alston (optional shelter)
William Howard School in Brampton
Moffat Academy (northbound only)
Eskdalemuir (southbound only) 
Innerleithen (southbound only)  
Gracemount High School in Edinburgh
All other controls were used in both directions.

2022
The 2021 event was postponed due to the COVID-19 pandemic and as a result took place between 7 and 12 August 2022. The route was extended to 1540km, with a time allowance of 128 hours and 20 minutes for the main group and 100 hours for the first group. The route extended out to Dunfermline so included a crossing of the Firth of Forth, and passed through Edinburgh city centre.

References

Further reading

External links 
London Edinburgh London official site

Cycling events in the United Kingdom
Cycling in England
Cycling in Scotland
Ultra-distance cycling